The eighth electoral unit of Republika Srpska is a parliamentary constituency used to elect members to the National Assembly of Republika Srpska since 2014.  It consists of the Municipalities of Sokolac, 
Han Pijesak,
Istočna Ilidža,
Istočni Stari Grad,
Istočno Novo Sarajevo,
Trnovo,
Pale and
Rogatica.

Demographics

Representatives

References

Constituencies of Bosnia and Herzegovina